Barbara W. Ballard (born November 14, 1944) is a Democratic member of the Kansas House of Representatives, representing the 44th district.  Born in Petersburg, Virginia, she has served since 1993.

Prior to her election to the House, Ballard served on the Lawrence School Board from 1985 to 1993. Ballard is treasurer of the Kansas African American Legislative Caucus.

Ballard earned a bachelor's degree from Webster College in 1967, a Master of Science in 1976 and a doctorate in 1980, both from Kansas State University. She worked as an elementary school teacher, and from 1980 until 2004 was dean of students at the University of Kansas as well as director of the Emily Taylor Women's Resource Center. She is now associate director of Civic Engagement & Outreach for the Dole Institute of Politics.

Ballard is the chairwoman of the House Democratic Caucus.

Committee membership
During the Legislative Sessions of 2013–2014, Rep. Ballard served on the following legislative committees:
Appropriations
Calendar and Printing (Ranking minority member)
Robert G. (Bob) Bethell Joint Committee on Home and community Based Services and KanCare Oversight
Social Services Budget (Ranking minority member

References

External links
Dole Institute Website
Kansas Legislature - Barbara Ballard
Project Vote Smart profile
Kansas Votes profile
State Surge - Legislative and voting track record
Follow the Money campaign contributions:
1998,2002, 2004, 2006, 2008

Democratic Party members of the Kansas House of Representatives
Living people
Women state legislators in Kansas
Kansas State University alumni
Webster University alumni
1944 births
African-American state legislators in Kansas
African-American women in politics
Educators from Kansas
American women educators
Politicians from Petersburg, Virginia
21st-century American politicians
21st-century American women politicians
20th-century American politicians
20th-century American women politicians
20th-century African-American women
20th-century African-American politicians
21st-century African-American women
21st-century African-American politicians